Mariama Bâ (April 17, 1929 – August 17, 1981) was a Senegalese author and feminist, whose two French-language novels were both translated into more than a dozen languages. Born in Dakar, she was raised a Muslim. 

Her frustration with the fate of African women is expressed in her first novel, Une si longue lettre (1979; translated into English as So Long a Letter). In this semi-autobiographical epistolary work, Bâ depicts the sorrow and resignation of a woman who must share the mourning for her late husband with his second, younger wife. This short book was awarded the first Noma Award for Publishing in Africa in 1980.

Biography
Bâ was born in Dakar, Senegal, in 1929, into an educated and well-to-do Senegalese family of Lebu ethnicity. Her father was a career civil servant who became one of the first ministers of state. He was the Minister of Health in 1956 while her grandfather was an interpreter in the French occupation regime. After her mother's death, Bâ was largely raised in the traditional manner by her maternal grandparents. She received her early education in French, while at the same time attending Koranic school.

Bâ was a prominent law student at school. During the colonial revolution period and later, girls faced numerous obstacles when they wanted to have a higher education. Bâ's grandparents did not plan to educate her beyond primary school. However, her father's insistence on giving her an opportunity to continue her studies eventually persuaded them.

In a teacher training college based in Rufisque (a suburb in Dakar), she won the first prize in the entrance examination and entered the École Normale. In this institution, she was prepared for later career as a school teacher. The school's principal began to prepare her for the 1943 entrance examination to a teaching career after he noticed Bâ's intellect and capacity. She taught from 1947 to 1959, before transferring to the Regional Inspectorate of teaching as an educational inspector.

Bâ was married three times and had nine children; her third and longest marriage was to a Senegalese member of Parliament, Obèye Diop, but they divorced.

Bâ died in 1981 after a protracted illness, before the publication of her second novel, Un Chant écarlate (Scarlet Song), which is a love story between two star-crossed lovers from different ethical backgrounds fighting the tyranny of tradition.

Work
Bâ wrote two books: So Long a Letter (1979) and Scarlet Song (1981), in addition to "La fonction politique des littératures Africaines écrites" (The Political Function of African Written Literature), an article published in 1981.

So Long a Letter

In 1980, Une si longue lettre, translated as So Long a Letter, was awarded the first Noma Award for Publishing in Africa. In this book, the author recognized the immense contributions African women have made and continue to make in the building of their societies.

The book is written in the form of a letter, or a diary, from a widow, Ramatoulaye, to her childhood girlfriend, Aissatou, who lives in the United States. Nafissatou Niang Diallo (1941–1982), who started her works in the 1970s, was a mirror for Mariama Bâ, whose leading role was a strong-minded character. Moreover, she found support, friendship and values from female confidence, unity and harmony. The discriminatory use of power forces Ramatoulaye to deal with its consequences. This discriminatory power is what is in the novel a form of male domination coming from society's construction of a patriarchal ideology. Because Ramatoulaye is a woman, she has little power in determining her own destiny, but Aissatou rejects this notion and chooses her own life without being denied a life of her own by her husband Mawdo.

Scarlet Song
Scarlet Song (1981) also gained international attention. This book deals with the critically urgent need for women to create "empowered" spaces for themselves, meaning, women need to create a space where they are not considered the "weaker sex". Scarlet Song is about a marriage between a European woman and an African man. Mireille, whose father is a French diplomat, marries Ousmane, son of a poor Senegalese Muslim family. Moving back from Paris to Senegal, Ousmane once again adopts his traditions and customs. But, as an occidental, Mireille cannot handle this kind of life, especially when Ousmane takes a second wife. However, Senegal has a polygamous society and in their religion it is acceptable but Mireille did not accept it. She suffers the marriage. Most notably, the book criticizes the tyranny of tradition and expounds upon the despair of cross-cultural marriages.

"La Fonction politique des littératures africaines écrites"
In this article from 1981, Mariama Bâ states that every African woman should be proud of her strength and accomplishments. She believes that each woman contributes to Africa's development and participates in Africa's growth.

Feminism and politics
Bâ neither accepted the label "feminist", which for her was too loaded with Western values, nor agreed with the traditional Senegalese Muslim values for women. According to Rizwana Habib Latha, the character of Ramatoulaye in So Long a Letter does portray a kind of womanism, and Bâ herself saw an important role for African women writers: The woman writer in Africa has a special task. She has to present the position of women in Africa in all its aspects. There is still so much injustice. . . . In the family, in the institutions, in society, in the street, in political organizations, discrimination reigns supreme. . . . As women, we must work for our own future, we must overthrow the status quo which harms us and we must no longer submit to it. Like men, we must use literature as a non-violent but effective weapon.

Legacy
A biography of Bâ was published in Dakar in 2007: Mariama Bâ ou les allées d'un destin by her daughter, Mame Coumba Ndiaye, was praised by Jean-Marie Volet as "a fascinating, considerate and enlightening" book.

Mariama Bâ Boarding School (Maison d'Education Mariama Bâ)
The Mariama Bâ Boarding School is a top boarding school on Gorée, an island in Senegal. It was founded in 1977 by Leopold Sedar Senghor, first president of Senegal. The school was named after Mariama Bâ because of what she stood for, spoke and wrote about. It admits young women who obtained the highest scores during the national secondary school entry exam. Each year, about 25 female students from the 11 regions of Senegal, are given the opportunity to attend Mariama Bâ boarding school for the rest of their high school years. The curriculum is similar to secondary education in France in that it has seven levels, and students finish with their baccalaureat. In 2009, Jana Films, a Spanish production company, filmed a documentary about the school, directed by Ana Rodríguez Rosell.

Bibliography

 Une si longue lettre (Dakar: Les Nouvelles Éditions Africaines, 1979). So Long a Letter, trans. Modupé Bodé-Thomas (Heinemann, 1981; Virago, 1982; Waveland Press, 2012)
 Un Chant écarlate (Dakar: Les Nouvelles Éditions Africaines, 1981). Scarlet Song, trans. Dorothy S. Blair (Longman, 1985)
"La fonction politique des littératures africaines écrites", in Écriture Française dans le monde, 5(3), 1981, pp. 3-7

Further reading
 Curry, Ginette. Awakening African Women: The Dynamics of Change. London: Cambridge Scholars Press, January 4, 2004.
 Ada Uzoamaka Azodo (ed.), Emerging Perspectives on Mariama Bâ: Postcolonialism, Feminism, and Postmodernism, Africa World Press (2003), .
 George, Joseph, "African Literature" ch. 12 of Understanding Contemporary Africa, April A. Gordon and Donald L. Gordon, Lynne Rienner, London, 1996, .
 Laura Charlotte Kempen, Mariama Bâ, Rigoberta Menchú, and Postcolonial Feminism, Peter Lang Publishing (2001), .

References

1929 births
1981 deaths
Senegalese feminists
Feminist writers
People of French West Africa
Senegalese women novelists
20th-century novelists
20th-century women writers
Senegalese novelists
20th-century Senegalese writers